Chiari is a comune in the province of Brescia, in Lombardy, northern Italy. The 1701 Battle of Chiari was fought here during the War of the Spanish Succession. The town is the birthplace of Isidoro Chiari and Stefano Antonio Morcelli. The main church or duomo is the church of Santi Faustino e Giovita, Chiari.

Twin towns
Chiari is twinned with:

  Valmadrera, Italy, since 2009
  Algemesí, Spain, since 2014

Transport
 Chiari railway station

References